The 1931 Oklahoma City Goldbugs football team was an American football team that represented Oklahoma City University during the 1931 college football season as a member of the Big Four Conference. In Vee Green's fourth season as head coach, the team compiled a perfect record of 12–0 and won the conference championship, outscoring their competition by a combined point total of 269 to 45 and shutting out eight of their opponents.

Schedule

References

Oklahoma City
Oklahoma City Chiefs football seasons
College football undefeated seasons
Oklahoma City Goldbugs football